The Ministry of Culture of Estonia is a Cabinet-level governmental agency in Estonia in charge of conducting and organising the country's cultural affairs and policies.

Structure of the ministry
The ministry is headed by the minister who interacts with undersecretaries on Fine Arts, Cultural Heritage, International Relations and Cultural Diversity, and Sports.  The ministry is responsible for creating favorable legislative and financial conditions for promotion and development of Estonian culture, its heritage, and sports.

The areas the Ministry of Culture is responsible for are:
 Literature and publishing
 Theatre
 Music
 Fine arts
 Cinema
 Folk art
 Museums
 Libraries
 Cultural heritage
 Creative industries
 Broadcasting and audiovisual policy
 Copyright and neighboring rights
 Cultural diversity and integration
 Sports

List of Ministers of Culture

See also 
 Cabinet of Estonia
 Culture of Estonia

References

External links
 Ministry of Culture of Estonia

Estonia
Estonian culture
Estonia, Culture
Culture